Mamuka Pantsulaia (9 October 1967 – 26 February 2019) was a Georgian footballer who played as a forward and made one appearance for the Georgia national team.

Career
Pantsulaia played for the Soviet Union under-16 national team in 1985, helping the team to win the 1985 UEFA European Under-16 Championship with two goals in the final. He was named the best player of the tournament. In total, he scored 8 goals in 17 matches for the Soviet youth teams. He earned his first and only cap for Georgia on 27 May 1990 in the country's first international match, a friendly against Lithuania. He started the match, but was substituted out at half-time for Gocha Gogrichiani. The home fixture, which took place in Tbilisi, finished as a 2–2 draw.

Pantsulaia played for Dinamo Tbilisi in the Soviet Top League from 1985 to 1989, and for Torpedo Kutaisi in the Soviet First League in 1989. Georgia began its own league, the Umaglesi Liga, in 1990 after the founding of the Georgian Football Federation, with Pantsulaia playing for Metallurgi Rustavi (originally Gorda Rustavi), Shevardeni-1906 Tbilisi and Odishi Zugdidi. He was the top scorer, along with Gia Guruli, of the league's first season in 1990 with 23 goals. In 1991, he was given a one-year suspension after arguing with a referee.

After retiring from football, he later became a coach of the Olimpi Rustavi youth academy, helping to train players including Tornike Okriashvili.

Personal life
Pantsulaia's son, Giorgi, is also a footballer and appeared for the Georgia youth national teams. Pantsulaia died on 26 February 2019.

Career statistics

International

Honours
Soviet Union U16
 UEFA European Under-16 Championship: 1985

Individual
 UEFA European Under-16 Championship player of the tournament: 1985
 Master of Sport of the USSR: 1985
 Umaglesi Liga top scorer: 1990

References

External links
 
 
 

1967 births
2019 deaths
Footballers from Tbilisi
Soviet footballers
Footballers from Georgia (country)
Soviet Union youth international footballers
Georgia (country) international footballers
Association football forwards
FC Dinamo Tbilisi players
FC Torpedo Kutaisi players
FC Metalurgi Rustavi players
FC Shevardeni-1906 Tbilisi players
FC Zugdidi players
Soviet Top League players
Soviet First League players
Erovnuli Liga players
Football managers from Georgia (country)